Teodora Duhovnikova (née Ivanova; born 14 December 1977) is a Bulgarian actress. She is best known for her roles in the BNT series Undercover (2011–2013). She is also known for her roles in Boyka: Undisputed (2016) and Omnipresent (2017).

Early life and education
Duhovnikova was born on 14 December 1977 in Sofia, Bulgaria. She graduated from the National School for Ancient Languages and Cultures, and later from the National Academy for Theatre and Film Arts.

Selected filmography

Film

Television

Voice

References

External links

1977 births
Living people
Actresses from Sofia
21st-century Bulgarian actresses
Bulgarian film actresses
Bulgarian stage actresses
Bulgarian voice actresses
National Academy for Theatre and Film Arts alumni